The Scottish Division, Royal Artillery, was an administrative grouping of garrison units of the Royal Artillery, Artillery Militia and Artillery Volunteers within the British Army's Scottish District from 1882 to 1889.

Organisation
Under General Order 72 of 4 April 1882 the Royal Artillery (RA) broke up its existing administrative brigades of garrison artillery (7th–11th Brigades, RA) and assigned the individual batteries to 11 new territorial divisions. These divisions were purely administrative and recruiting organisations, not field formations. Most were formed within the existing military districts into which the United Kingdom was divided, and for the first time associated the part-time Artillery Militia with the regulars. Shortly afterwards the Artillery Volunteers were also added to the territorial divisions. The Regular Army batteries were grouped into one brigade, usually of nine sequentially-numbered batteries and a depot battery. For these units the divisions represented recruiting districts – batteries could be serving anywhere in the British Empire and their only connection to brigade headquarters (HQ) was for the supply of drafts and recruits. The artillery militia units (sometimes referred to as regiments) already comprised a number of batteries, and were redesignated as brigades, losing their county titles in the process. The artillery volunteers, which had previously consisted of numerous independent Artillery Volunteer Corps (AVC) of various sizes, sometimes grouped into administrative brigades, had been consolidated into larger AVCs in 1881, which were now affiliated to the appropriate territorial division.

Composition
Scottish Division, RA, listed as eighth in order of precedence, was organised within Scottish District with the following composition:

 Headquarters (HQ) at Leith
 1st Brigade
 HQ at Leith
 1st Bty at Malta – formerly 8th Bty, 9th Bde
 2nd (Mountain) Bty at Murree Hills – formerly 6th Bty, 7th Bde
 3rd Bty in India – formerly 7th Bty, 7th Bde
 4th Bty at Sheerness – formerly 1st Bty, 9th Bde
 5th Bty in Egypt – formerly 1st Bty, 10th Bde
 6th Bty in Egypt – formerly 1st Bty, 11th Bde
 7th Bty at Dover – formerly 10th Bty, 9th Bde
 8th Bty at Sheerness – formerly 14th Bty, 9th Bde
 9th Bty at Bombay – formerly 15th Bty, 9th Bde
 10th Bty – new Bty formed 1887
 Depot Bty at Leith – formerly Depot Bty, 4th Bde
 2nd Brigade at Dunbar – formerly Haddington, Berwick, Linlithgow and Peebles Artillery Militia (6 btys)
 3rd Brigade at Edinburgh – formerly Duke of Edinburgh's Own Edinburgh Artillery (6 btys)
 4th Brigade at Cupar – formerly Fifeshire Artillery Militia (6 btys)
 5th Brigade at Montrose – formerly Forfar and Kincardine Artillery (8 btys)
 6th Brigade at Campbeltown – formerly Argyll and Bute Artillery Militia (5 btys)
 1st Edinburgh (City) Artillery Volunteers at Edinburgh
 1st Midlothian Artillery Volunteers at Leith
 1st Banffshire Artillery Volunteers at Banff
 1st Forfarshire Artillery Volunteers at Dundee
 1st Renfrew and Dumbarton Artillery Volunteers at Greenock
 1st Fife Artillery Volunteers at St Andrews
 1st Haddington Artillery Volunteers at Dunbar
 1st Lanarkshire Artillery Volunteers at Glasgow
 1st Ayrshire and Galloway Artillery Volunteers at Ayr
 1st Argyll and Bute Artillery Volunteers at Rothesay
 1st Caithness Artillery Volunteers at Thurso
 1st Aberdeenshire Artillery Volunteers at Aberdeen
 1st Berwickshire Artillery Volunteers at Eyemouth
 1st Inverness Artillery Volunteers at Inverness
 1st Orkney Artillery Volunteers at Kirkwall

Disbandment
On 1 July 1889 the garrison artillery was reorganised again into three large territorial divisions of garrison artillery (Eastern, Southern and Western) and one of mountain artillery. The assignment of units to them seemed geographically arbitrary, with the Scottish units being grouped in the Southern Division, for example, but this related to where the need for coastal artillery was greatest, rather than where the units recruited. The regular batteries were distributed across most of the divisions and completely renumbered.

See also
 Royal Garrison Artillery
 List of Royal Artillery Divisions 1882–1902
 Eastern Division, Royal Artillery
 Southern Division, Royal Artillery
 Western Division, Royal Artillery
 Mountain Division, Royal Artillery

Footnotes

Notes

References
 J.B.M. Frederick, Lineage Book of British Land Forces 1660–1978, Vol II, Wakefield: Microform Academic, 1984, ISBN 1-85117-009-X.
 Lt-Gen H.G. Hart, The New Annual Army List, Militia List, Yeomanry Cavalry List and Indian Civil Service List for 1884, London: John Murray, 1883.
 Lt-Gen H.G. Hart, The New Annual Army List, Militia List, Yeomanry Cavalry List and Indian Civil Service List for 1890, London: John Murray, 1889.
 Lt-Col M.E.S. Lawes, Battery Records of the Royal Artillery, 1859–1877, Woolwich: Royal Artillery Institution, 1970.
 Norman E.H. Litchfield, The Militia Artillery 1852–1909 (Their Lineage, Uniforms and Badges), Nottingham: Sherwood Press, 1987, ISBN 0-9508205-1-2.
 Norman Litchfield & Ray Westlake, The Volunteer Artillery 1859–1908 (Their Lineage, Uniforms and Badges), Nottingham: Sherwood Press, 1982, ISBN 0-9508205-0-4.
 Col K. W. Maurice-Jones, The History of Coast Artillery in the British Army, London: Royal Artillery Institution, 1959/Uckfield: Naval & Military Press, 2005, ISBN 978-1-845740-31-3.
 War Office, Monthly Army List, London: HM Stationery Office, 1882–89.

Royal Artillery divisions
Military units and formations of Scotland
Military units and formations established in 1882
Military units and formations disestablished in 1889